Senate elections were held in the Czech Republic on 5 and 6 November 2004, with a second round on 12 and 13 November. The result was a victory for the Civic Democratic Party, which won 37 of the 81 seats. Voter turnout was 28.6% in the first round and just 18.4% in the second.

Results

References

Czech Republic
Senate
Senate elections in the Czech Republic
Czech